Ammu may refer to

Fiction 
 Ammu (1965 film)
 Ammu (2022 film)
 Ammu Ipe, a character in the novel The God of Small Things

People 
 Ammu Abhirami, actress
 Ammu Swaminathan, social worker and political activist
 Ammu Joseph, journalist, author, media analyst and editorial consultant